Monardella crispa is a rare species of flowering plant in the mint family known by the common name crisp monardella. It is endemic to California, where it is known only from the sand dunes on the coastline of San Luis Obispo and Santa Barbara Counties.

Description
It is an aromatic perennial herb growing in a spreading woolly mat or mound with one or more stems up to half a meter in length. The fleshy, waxy, sometimes woolly leaves are 1 to 5 centimeters long and borne in clusters along the stem. The inflorescence is a head of several flowers blooming in a cup of papery, hairy purplish to straw-colored bracts. The flowers are purplish pink in color.

References

External links
Jepson Manual Treatment of Monardella crispa
USDA Plants Profile for Monardella crispa
Monardella crispa — CalPhoto gallery

crispa
Endemic flora of California
Natural history of the California chaparral and woodlands
Natural history of San Luis Obispo County, California
Natural history of Santa Barbara County, California